Gandakha is a town of Jafarabad District in the Balochistan province of Pakistan. It is located at 28°1'0N 67°51'0E with an altitude of 40 metres (134 feet).
According to 2017 census population is 74976, Majority of the People are Jamali, Brahui, Lashari, Chinjni,Qambarani, Soomro etc.

References

Populated places in Jafarabad District